The 2007 Dunlop British Open Championships was held at the National Squash Centre from 18–24 September 2007. Grégory Gaultier won the title defeating Thierry Lincou in the final.

Seeds

Draw and results

Main draw

References

Men's British Open Squash Championships
Squash in England
Men's British Open
Men's British Open Squash Championship
Men's British Open Squash Championship
2000s in Manchester
Sports competitions in Manchester